Cathie Craigie (born 14 April 1954) is a former Scottish Labour politician who served as Member of the Scottish Parliament (MSP) for the Cumbernauld and Kilsyth constituency from 1999 to 2011.

Early life and career

Craigie was born in Stirling on 14 April 1954. She was a district councillor of Cumbernauld and Kilsyth from 1984 to 1994 and district leader from 1994 to 1996. She served as a North Lanarkshire councillor between 1996 and 1999.

Parliamentary career

Craigie was first elected to the Scottish Parliament at the 1999 election. She was re-elected to represent the Cumbernauld and Kilsyth constituency in 2003 with a majority of 520 votes and in 2007 with an increased majority of 2,079. However, at the 2011 election, she lost her seat to Jamie Hepburn of the Scottish National Party (SNP) by 3,459 votes.

Craigie was a member of the Justice Committee and the Petitions Committee in the Scottish Parliament. She was the first woman to successfully steer a Member's Bill, The Mortgage Rights (Scotland) Act, which provides greater protection for those facing repossession, through the parliament. Craigie was also the convenor of the Cross-Party group on Deafness, and was in the process of steering a British Sign Language Bill through the Scottish Parliament before losing her seat.

References

External links 
 
Cathie Craigie MSP Personal website
Cathie Cragie MSP Biography at Labour party website.

1954 births
Living people
People from Stirling
Labour MSPs
Members of the Scottish Parliament 1999–2003
Members of the Scottish Parliament 2003–2007
Members of the Scottish Parliament 2007–2011
Female members of the Scottish Parliament
20th-century Scottish women politicians
Scottish Labour councillors
Leaders of local authorities of Scotland
Women councillors in Scotland